John McEnroe was the defending champion but did not compete that year.

Boris Becker won the singles title at the 1985 Queen's Club Championships tennis tournament defeating Johan Kriek in the final 6–2, 6–3.

Seeds

  Jimmy Connors (first round)
  Kevin Curren (third round)
  Pat Cash (quarterfinals)
  Johan Kriek (final)
  Tim Mayotte (quarterfinals)
  Henri Leconte (second round)
  Scott Davis (first round)
  David Pate (third round)
  Paul Annacone (quarterfinals)
  Greg Holmes (first round)
  Boris Becker (champion)
  Ramesh Krishnan (third round)
  Mike Leach (first round)
  Ben Testerman (first round)
  Terry Moor (first round)
  Sammy Giammalva Jr. (second round)

Draw

Finals

Top half

Section 1

Section 2

Bottom half

Section 3

Section 4

References

External links
Official website Queen's Club Championships 
ATP tournament profile

Singles